Ghislain Gimbert (born 7 August 1985) is a French professional footballer who plays as a striker for amateur side FC Métropole Troyenne. In a career spanning 21 seasons to date, Gimbert has made more than 400 appearances, and scored 97 goals, in Ligue 2, with Grenoble, Tours, Libourne-Saint-Seurin, Vannes, Laval, Troyes, Le Havre and AC Ajaccio. He has played in Turkey and Belgium.

Honours
Vannes
 Coupe de la Ligue: runner-up 2008–09
Troyes AC
 Ligue 2: winner 2014–15

References

External links
 
 
 
 

1985 births
Living people
Sportspeople from Roanne
Association football forwards
French footballers
Grenoble Foot 38 players
Tours FC players
FC Libourne players
Vannes OC players
Stade Lavallois players
ES Troyes AC players
S.V. Zulte Waregem players
Le Havre AC players
AC Ajaccio players
Ümraniyespor footballers
Le Mans FC players
Ligue 2 players
Championnat National players
Belgian Pro League players
TFF First League players
French expatriate footballers
Expatriate footballers in Belgium
Expatriate footballers in Turkey
Footballers from Auvergne-Rhône-Alpes